The Governor of Lviv Oblast is the head of executive branch for the Lviv Oblast.

The office of Governor is an appointed position, with officeholders being appointed by the President of Ukraine, on recommendation from the Prime Minister of Ukraine.

The official residence for the Governor is in Lviv. The Governor is Maksym Kozytskyy, he was appointed on February 5, 2020.

Governors
 1991 – 1992 Vyacheslav Chornovil (acting; as chairman of the Council and its Executive Committee)
 1992 – 1994 Stepan Davymuka (as Presidential representative)
 1994 – 1997 Mykola Horyn (until 1995 acting; as chairman of the Executive Committee)
 1997 – 1999 Mykhailo Hladiy
 1999 – 2001 Stepan Senchuk
 2001 – 2002 Mykhailo Hladiy
 2002 – 2003 Myron Yankiv
 2003 – 2004 Oleksandr Sendeha
 2004 – 2005 Bohdan Matolych (acting)
 2005 – 2008 Petro Oliynyk
 2008 – 2008 Valeriy Pyatak (acting)
 2008 – 2010 Mykola Kmit (acting to September 1, 2008)
 2010 – 2010 Vasyl Horbal
 2010 – 2011 Mykhailo Tsymbaliuk
 2011 – 2013 Mykhailo Kostyuk
 2013 – 2013 Viktor Shemchuk
 2013 – 2014 Oleh Salo
 2014 – 2014 Iryna Sekh
 2014 – 2014 Yuriy Turyansky (acting)
 2014 – 2019 Oleh Synyutka
 2019 – 2019 Rostyslav Zamlynsky (acting)
 2019 – 2019 Markiyan Malsky
 2020 – incumbent Maksym Kozytskyy

References

External links
Government of Lviv Oblast  in Ukrainian
Lviv at the World Statesmen.org

 
Lviv Oblast